The rixosome is a protein complex named after the S. cerevisiae gene RIX1 involved in RNA degradation, ribosomal RNA (rRNA) processing and ribosome biogenesis. The rixosome associates with human PRC1 and PRC2 complexes. The interaction with PRC1 appears to be through the RING1B domain of PRC1 based on mutational analysis. The colocalization of the risoxome and PRC complex suggest a role in rixosomal degradation of nascent RNA to contributes to silencing of many Polycomb targets in human cells.

Components 
Rixosome complex contains the following components:
 WD repeat domain 18
 LAS1L
 TEX10
 PELP1

References 

Protein complexes